Hugo Rogério Ferreira Monteiro (born 9 May 1985 in Porto) is a Portuguese retired professional footballer who played as a winger.

Club career
A product of local Boavista FC's youth system, Monteiro made his first-team debut during 2003–04, playing six minutes in a 2–1 home win against C.S. Marítimo for his only Primeira Liga appearance of the season. He split the following campaign between two teams, U.S.C. Paredes and C.F. União de Lamas, both in the third division and in both cases on loan.

Upon his return to the Porto-based club, Monteiro made only a further 26 league appearances for the Axadrezados (chequereds) in three seasons combined, 16 of those coming in 2006–07. In the summer of 2008, following Boavista's top flight relegation, he was sold to another side in the second level, Gil Vicente FC.

In 2010, after one season in division three with Gondomar SC, Monteiro returned to the second tier with F.C. Arouca, appearing in just seven matches in his first year as the team managed to retain their newly acquired status.

External links

1985 births
Living people
Footballers from Porto
Portuguese footballers
Association football wingers
Primeira Liga players
Liga Portugal 2 players
Segunda Divisão players
Boavista F.C. players
U.S.C. Paredes players
C.F. União de Lamas players
Gil Vicente F.C. players
Gondomar S.C. players
F.C. Arouca players
Leixões S.C. players
Anadia F.C. players
Portugal youth international footballers